Reportage 57 is an East German film, released in 1959. It was directed by János Veiczi and stars Annekathrin Bürger, Willi Schrade and Gerhard Bienert.
The film is said to have "drew on negative depictions of Halbstarke and rock 'n' roll in West Berlin in its critiques of the West."

Cast
 Annekathrin Bürger as Inge
 Willi Schrade as Heinz
 Gerhard Bienert as Vater Kramer
 Wilhelm Koch-Hooge as Lowinsky
 Edwin Marian as Leimtüte
 Paul Berndt as Godelmann
 Manfred Krug as Biene
 Habbo Lolling as Ede
 Christina Monden as Hedi
 Gert Andreae as Boy
 Werner Lierck as Paul

References

External links
 

1959 films
East German films
1950s German-language films
Films set in Berlin
1950s German films